The 1978 World trials season consisted of twelve trials events. It began on 11 February, with round one in Newtownards, Ireland and ended with round twelve in Ricany, Czechoslovakia on 24 September.

Season summary
Yrjo Vesterinen would claim his third World trials championship in 1978, repeating his 1976 and 1977 titles.

1978 World trials season calendar

Scoring system
Points were awarded to the top ten finishers. All twelve rounds counted for the World Trials class.

World Trials final standings

{|
|

References

1978 in motorcycle sport